Robert Osbourne Denver (January 9, 1935 – September 2, 2005) was an American comedic actor who portrayed Gilligan on the 1964–1967 television series Gilligan's Island, and beatnik Maynard G. Krebs on the 1959–1963 series The Many Loves of Dobie Gillis.

Early life
Denver was born on January 9, 1935, in New Rochelle, New York, and raised in Brownwood, Texas.He graduated in 1953 at David Starr Jordan High School in Long Beach, California. He graduated from Loyola University in Los Angeles, California, with a degree in political science. He acted in college productions at Loyola and met fellow student Dwayne Hickman, with whom he later co-starred in The Many Loves of Dobie Gillis. After graduation, he coached physical education and taught mathematics and history at Corpus Christi School, a Catholic elementary school in Pacific Palisades, California.

Career
Most of Denver's acting career was in television, though he also appeared in several films and on Broadway. He was widely associated with the title character that he played in the 1960s television series Gilligan's Island, and he continued to appear as Gilligan in several movies, as a guest on other television series, in personal appearances, and as a voice actor in the animated version of the series.

Television career
Denver made his television debut in 1957, playing a small part in an episode of The Silent Service (S01 E37: "The Loss of the Tang"). While teaching at Corpus Christi in 1958, Denver was permitted to audition for a role on the sitcom The Many Loves of Dobie Gillis as a favor to his sister, who was a secretary on the production lot. He gained the role and left teaching the following year to become a regular on the series. From 1959 to 1963, he appeared on the series as Maynard G. Krebs, the teenaged beatnik best friend of Dobie Gillis, played by Dwayne Hickman. After filming the first three episodes, Denver received his draft notice, and was briefly written out of the script and replaced, but he was designated 4-F due to an old neck injury and returned to Dobie Gillis having missed only one episode. Denver later reprised his Maynard G. Krebs role in the television sequels Whatever Happened to Dobie Gillis? (1977) and Bring Me the Head of Dobie Gillis (1988).

During his time on Dobie Gillis, Denver appeared on the NBC interview program, Here's Hollywood. In 1963, Denver played his only major dramatic role on television, as a physician (Dr. Paul Garrett) in one episode of Dr. Kildare, telecast on October 10, 1963; the episode, "If You Can't Believe the Truth ...", also featured Barbara Eden and Ken Berry. Between the end of Dobie Gillis and the beginning of Gilligan's Island, Denver appeared in an episode of The Farmer's Daughter and in the final episode of The Danny Thomas Show. He also had a one-episode role replacing the actor who played Dudley A. "Dud" Wash, the fiancé of Charlene Darling of the Darlings, on The Andy Griffith Show which was aired March 30, 1964. This was done by the network to promote Denver's face and make him more familiar to the viewing audience since Gilligan's Island was about to go on air.

Following the cancellation of Dobie Gillis, Denver landed the title role on the sitcom Gilligan's Island, which ran for three seasons (1964–67) on CBS, and became a staple of later syndication. His role as the well-meaning but bumbling first mate among a small group of shipwrecked castaways became the one for which he is most remembered. During the run, Denver privately went out of his way to help his co-stars who warmly appreciated his efforts, such as successfully demanding that Russell Johnson and Dawn Wells be included in the series' opening credits and insisting that Wells get an equal share of the series' publicity with Tina Louise. A decade after the series was canceled, Denver played Gilligan in the made-for-TV reunion movies Rescue from Gilligan's Island (1978), The Castaways on Gilligan's Island (1979), and The Harlem Globetrotters on Gilligan's Island (1981). He also lent his voice to the animated series The New Adventures of Gilligan and its sequel Gilligan's Planet. During the 1980s and 1992, he reprised the character of Gilligan for numerous cameo appearances, including episodes of ALF, Meego and Baywatch, and played a bartender in the film Back to the Beach (1987).

After Gilligan's Island, Denver went on to star on other TV comedy series, including The Good Guys (1968–1970), Dusty's Trail (1973-1974) (a show similar to Gilligan's Island, involving a lost wagon train headed to California), and the Sid and Marty Krofft children's program Far Out Space Nuts (1975). Four episodes of Dusty's Trail were later combined to create a feature film, The Wackiest Wagon Train in the West (1976).

Denver's other television roles included guest appearances on multiple episodes of Love, American Style; The Love Boat; and Fantasy Island. In 1983, he starred in the television pilot The Invisible Woman as the bumbling mad scientist uncle of the title character.

Film career
Denver's first feature film appearance was in the service farce, A Private's Affair (1959), with Sal Mineo. Credited as Robert Denver, he had a small role in the Jimmy Stewart film, Take Her, She's Mine (1963), playing a beatnik poet working at a coffee shop. Denver also appeared in the beach film For Those Who Think Young (1964) with Tina Louise prior to the development of Gilligan's Island.

Other films in which Denver appeared include Who's Minding the Mint? (1967), The Sweet Ride (1968), Did You Hear the One About the Traveling Saleslady? (1968) with Phyllis Diller, and The Wackiest Wagon Train in the West (1976).  In 1983, he appeared in the television movie High School U.S.A..  His final role was a small part in the Frankie Avalon-Annette Funicello comedy Back to the Beach (1987).

Other work

In 1970, Denver replaced Woody Allen in the original Broadway production of Allen's comedy Play It Again, Sam, earning praise from The New York Times critic Clive Barnes for conveying "a genuine clown-like wistfulness" that Barnes had found lacking in Allen's own performance in the starring role.

Personal life
Denver was married four times. His wives were: Maggie Ryan (1960–1966), Jean Webber (1967–1970), Carole Abrahams (1972–1975), and Dreama Perry. He fathered two sons, Patrick and Colin, and two daughters, Megan and Emily.

On February 7, 1971, Denver was arrested in Anderson, California for possession of marijuana and drug paraphernalia in his car and pleaded no contest for a reduced sentence of a $250 fine. In 1998, he was arrested for marijuana delivered to his home, originally saying that the delivery came from Dawn Wells, who played Mary Ann on Gilligan's Island, but he later refused to name her in court, testifying that "some crazy fan must have sent it." He pleaded no contest and received six months probation.

Later in his life, Denver returned to his adopted home of Princeton, West Virginia, and became an FM radio personality. He and his wife Dreama ran a small "oldies format" radio station, WGAG-LP 93.1 FM. He also earned a small income making public appearances, often costumed as Gilligan. In 1992, he played Gilligan to benefit the Make-A-Wish Foundation for a West Virginia fundraiser for the organization.

Denver was a heavy smoker. He received cancer treatment and underwent heart bypass surgery in 2005. On September 2, 2005, he died at age 70 from complications including pneumonia following throat cancer surgery at Wake Forest University Baptist Medical Center in Winston-Salem, North Carolina.

Filmography

Film

Television

References

External links

 
 
 
 
 
 
 Official website 

1935 births
2005 deaths
20th-century American male actors
American male television actors
Deaths from cancer in North Carolina
Deaths from laryngeal cancer
Deaths from pneumonia in North Carolina
Loyola Marymount University alumni
People from Brownwood, Texas
Male actors from New Rochelle, New York
People from Princeton, West Virginia
Radio personalities from West Virginia